Al-Mashriq (المشرق) is a daily newspaper published in Iraq. The paper was launched in 2003 following the US invasion of Iraq. It is based in Baghdad. It is privately owned and is published daily except for Fridays.

On 4 March 2007 the editor-in-chief of the paper, Muhan Al Zahir, was killed in Baghdad.

See also
Newspapers in Iraq

References

External links
 Official website

2003 establishments in Iraq
Arabic-language newspapers
Mass media in Baghdad
Newspapers published in Iraq
Publications established in 2003